Dabasu Durovys is a Latvian pop rock band, formed at the beginning of 2006 in Daugavpils. Most lyrics of their songs are written in Latgalian. The band's name is Latgalian for "the doors of the sky".

Dabasu Durovys is one of the first rock bands that started to write music in Latgalian, and it can be considered the member of the "Latgalian Music New Wave". The band has recorded the first ever Latgalian blues (Vipingys blūzs) and Dixieland (Vacais mašinists). The band has taken influences from the 60's pop and rock, folk rock, blues music and British pop rock.

In 2008, the band released their first music album Lepetnīks ('Butterfly'). Like many other new bands, Dabasu Durovys has taken part in many contests for young bands, with some success in 2007 (Mic Rec bārs Open) and 2010 (Četri balti krekli New Music Contest).The band has also participated in the notable Latvian music festival "Bildes". In 2012 their album Styklu Vītā Skaņa ('Sound instead of glass') was nominated as one of top 5 best pop rock albums of 2012 in the Annual Latvian Music Awards (Latvijas Mūzikas Gada Balva). Apart from playing more than 20 concerts a year, Dabasu Durovys has also participated in festivals abroad – Lithuania (2007, 2009, 2011, 2012), Portugal (2010), Australia (2011) and Poland (2015). 
In 2016, the band released their fourth album Pādys Runoj ('The Footprints Talk').

Radio singles

Discography 
 Lepetnīks (2008)
 Styklu Vītā Skaņa (2012)
 Bāka (2014)
 Pādys Runoj (2016)

External links 
 Official website

Latvian rock music groups
Daugavpils